RX100 may refer to:
 Sony Cyber-shot DSC-RX100, a digital camera
 Yamaha RX 100, a motorcycle
 RX-100, an Indonesian RX-family rocket
 RX 100, a 2018 Indian Telugu-language film